Uğur Boral (born 14 April 1982) is a Turkish retired footballer who last played for Beşiktaş in the Süper Lig.

Boral was a gifted play-maker and surprised goalkeepers with his deceptive shot. He is naturally left-footed and can played as a left-sided midfielder or as a left-back, given the situation.

Club career
Boral began his career in 1995, when he signed with the amateur club Gaziosmanpaşa Karadenizspor. In 1998, he moved to Alibeyköyspor. He was transferred to Gençlerbirliği during the 2000–01 season after his stay with Kocaelispor. In 2006, Boral signed with Fenerbahçe, where he was given the number 25 shirt. He scored two goals on his Champions League debut against CSKA Moscow on Matchday 6 of the 2007–08 season.

Boral signed a 1-year contract for Fenerbahçe, until 2012. Boral played shortly for Samsunspor in 2012, before returning to Istanbuls Beşiktas for the time between 2012 and 2015. He retired in 2015.

International career

Euro 2008
He was called up to Turkey's Euro 2008 squad and started the semi-final against Germany on 25 June 2008 at St. Jakob-Park, Basel. He scored the opening goal, which was also his first for Turkey. Turkey eventually lost 3–2.

International goal

Honours
Fenerbahçe
Süper Lig (2): 2006–07, 2010–11
Süper Kupa (2): 2007, 2009

Turkey
 UEFA European Championship bronze medalist: 2008

Prosecution 
In the aftermath of the attempted coup d'état of July 2016 he was accused of being involved in the Gülen movement. In January 2020 Boral was sentenced to 2 years and 3 months imprisonment for being a member of an armed terror organization due to his links to the Gülen movement.

References

External links
 
 

1982 births
Living people
Footballers from Istanbul
Turkish footballers
Turkey international footballers
Turkey B international footballers
Ankaraspor footballers
Kocaelispor footballers
Gençlerbirliği S.K. footballers
Fenerbahçe S.K. footballers
Samsunspor footballers
Beşiktaş J.K. footballers
UEFA Euro 2008 players
Süper Lig players
Association football midfielders
Turkish prisoners and detainees